The Mummies of Guanajuato are a number of naturally mummified bodies interred during a cholera outbreak around Guanajuato, Mexico in 1833.

The human bodies appear to have been disinterred between 1870 and 1958. During that time, a local tax was in place requiring a fee to be paid for "perpetual" burial. Some bodies for which the tax was not paid were disinterred, and some—apparently those in the best condition—were stored in a nearby building. The climate of Guanajuato provides an environment which can lead to a type of natural mummification, although scientific studies later revealed that some bodies had been at least partially embalmed.
By the 1900s the mummies began attracting tourists. Cemetery workers began charging people a few pesos to enter the building where bones and mummies were stored.

This place was subsequently turned into a museum called El Museo de las Momias ("The Museum of the Mummies") in 1969.  As of 2007, 59 mummies were on display, of a collection that totals 111.

History 

"The mummies began to be exhumed from a Guanajuato cemetery when a law was enacted locally requiring families to pay a 'burial tax' to ensure the perpetual burial of a loved one. If the tax was not paid, the body was removed. Being naturally mummified, it was stored in a building above ground, and people began paying to see the bodies in the late 1800s. The law requiring the burial tax was abolished in 1958."

As of 2006, this museum continued to exhibit 59 of the total of 111 mummies in the collection.

Origin 

Due to the demands of the epidemic (see 1829–51 cholera pandemic), more cemeteries had to be opened in San Cayetano and Cañada de Marfil. Many of the bodies were buried immediately to control the spread of the disease. It is thought that in some cases, the dying may have been buried alive by accident, resulting in horrific facial expressions. However, perceived facial expressions are most often the result of postmortem processes. One of the mummies who was buried alive was Ignacia Aguilar. She suffered from a strange sickness that made her heart appear to stop on several occasions. During one of these incidents, her heart appeared to stop for more than a day. Thinking she had died, her relatives decided to bury her. When her body was disinterred, it was noticed that she was facing down, biting her arm, and that there was a lot of blood in her mouth.

The first mummy was put on display in 1865. It was the body of Dr. Remigio Leroy. The museum, containing at least 108 corpses, is located above the spot where the mummies were first discovered. Numerous mummies can be seen throughout the exhibition, of varying sizes. The museum is known to have the smallest mummy in the world, a fetus from a pregnant woman who fell victim to cholera. Some of the mummies can be seen wearing parts of the clothing in which they were buried.

The mummies are a notable part of Mexican popular culture, echoing the national holiday "The Day of the Dead" (El Dia de los Muertos). A B movie titled Santo vs. The Mummies of Guanajuato (1970) pitted the well-known Mexican professional wrestler Santo and several others against reanimated mummies.

Author Ray Bradbury visited the catacombs of Guanajuato with his friend Grant Beach and wrote the short story "The Next in Line" about his experience. In the introduction to The Stories of Ray Bradbury he wrote the following about this story: "The experience so wounded and terrified me, I could hardly wait to flee Mexico. I had nightmares about dying and having to remain in the halls of the dead with those propped and wired bodies. In order to purge my terror, instantly, I wrote 'The Next in Line.' One of the few times that an experience yielded results almost on the spot."

To conjure a morbid and eerie atmospheric opening sequence to his film Nosferatu the Vampyre (1979), German director Werner Herzog used footage he had taken of several of the mummies.

Other mummies
Other locations in Mexico where the mummification process occurs naturally include:
 Encarnación de Díaz, Jalisco
 El Carmen complex, Mexico City

References

External links
 Museum's official website
 The Mummies of Guanajuato
 Professor unravels secrets of Guanajuato mummies

Guanajuato City
Guanajuato, Mummies of
Buildings and structures in Guanajuato